Addison Graves "Joe" Wilson Sr. (born July 31, 1947) is an American politician and attorney serving as the U.S. representative for  since 2001. A member of the Republican Party, his district stretches from Columbia to the Georgia–South Carolina border. He served as the South Carolina state senator from the 23rd district from 1985 to 2001.

Wilson is a member of the House Republican Policy Committee and an assistant Republican whip.

In September 2009, Wilson interrupted a speech by U.S. President Barack Obama to a joint session of Congress, shouting, "You lie!" The incident resulted in a reprimand by the House of Representatives.

Early life and education
Wilson was born in Charleston, South Carolina, the son of Wray (née Graves) and Hugh deVeaux Wilson. In 1969 he obtained a bachelor's degree in political science from Washington and Lee University, where he joined Sigma Nu. He obtained his Juris Doctor (J.D.) degree from the University of South Carolina School of Law in 1972.

Early career 
From 1972 to 1975, Wilson served in the United States Army Reserve. Thereafter, he was a Staff Judge Advocate in the South Carolina Army National Guard assigned to the 218th Mechanized Infantry Brigade until retiring from military service as a colonel in 2003.

A real estate attorney, Wilson co-accounted the law firm Kirkland, Wilson, Moore, Taylor & Thomas in West Columbia, where he practiced for over 25 years. He was also a municipal judge in Springdale, South Carolina.

Wilson was active in South Carolina Republican politics when the party barely existed in the state. He took part in his first Republican campaign in 1962, when he was 15 years old. He served as an aide to Senator Strom Thurmond and to his district's congressman, Floyd Spence.

In 1981 and 1982, during the first term of the Reagan administration, Wilson served as deputy general counsel for former governor Jim Edwards at the U.S. Department of Energy. Wilson is also a graduate of Morton Blackwell's Leadership Institute in Arlington, Virginia.

South Carolina Senate
Wilson was elected to the South Carolina Senate in 1984 as a Republican from Lexington County and reelected four times, the last three times unopposed. By this time, Lexington County had become one of the most Republican counties in the state. He never missed a regular legislative session in 17 years. After the Republicans gained control of the chamber in 1996, Wilson became the first Republican to chair the Senate Transportation Committee. He was a member of Columbia College's board of visitors and Coker College's board of trustees.

During his tenure in the South Carolina Senate, Wilson was the primary sponsor of bills including the following: establishing a National Guard license plate, providing paid leave for state employees to perform disaster relief services, and requiring men aged 18–26 to register for the Selective Service System when applying for a driver's license. In 2000, Wilson was one of seven senators to vote against removing the Confederate battle flag from being displayed over the state house.

U.S. House of Representatives

Committee assignments

As of the 118th Congress, Wilson served on three standing committees and various subcommittees overseeing specific areas of legislation. He serves on the Committee on Armed Services, for which he is also a member of the Subcommittee on Readiness and Subcommittee on Strategic Forces. He serves on the Committee on Education and the Workforce, for which he also is a member of the Subcommittee on Health, Employment, Labor, and Pensions. As a member of the Committee on Foreign Affairs, Wilson serves on the Subcommittee on Europe and Chairs the Subcommittee on the Middle East, North Africa, and Central Asia. Wilson serves as the Chair of the U.S. Helsinki Commission. Wilson is a member of the Republican Study Committee, Chair of the RSC National Security and Foreign Affairs Task Force, and a member of the Tea Party Caucus.

Caucus memberships
 Composites Caucus (co-chair)
 Counter-Kleptocracy Caucus (co-chair)
 Congressional United Kingdom Caucus (co-chair)
 Congressional French Caucus (co-chair)
 European Union Caucus (founder and co-chair)
 Congressional Caucus on Korea (co-chair)
 House Ethiopian-American Caucus (co-chair)
 Bulgaria Caucus (co-chair)
 Friends of Belarus Caucus (co-chair)
 Congressional Caucus on U.S.-Türkiye Relations and Turkish Americans (co-chair)
 Congressional Bangladesh Caucus (co-chair)
 Congressional Afghan Caucus (co-chair)
 Congressional Caucus on Qatari-American Strategic Relationships (co-chair)
 House Republican Israel Caucus (co-chair)
 Diabetes Caucus
 Global Health Caucus
 India Caucus
United States Congressional International Conservation Caucus
 Israel Allies Caucus
 Russia Democracy Caucus
 Sportsmen's Caucus
 House Republican Policy Committee
 Tea Party Caucus
 Congressional Arts Caucus
 Congressional Constitution Caucus
 Afterschool Caucuses
 Congressional NextGen 9-1-1 Caucus
Republican Study Committee

Like his former boss, Spence, Wilson is an ardent social and fiscal conservative.

In 2003, Wilson voted for the Medicare Prescription Drug, Improvement, and Modernization Act, including its Section 1011 authorizing $250,000 annually of taxpayer money to reimburse hospitals for treatment of illegal immigrants. In 2009, he changed to his current position of opposing public funds for health care of illegal immigrants.

Legislation
Wilson has sponsored and co-sponsored a number of bills concerning teacher recruitment and retention, college campus fire safety, National Guard troop levels, arming airline pilots, tax credits for adoptions, tax credits for living organ donors, and state defense forces. As of January 2006, eight bills he co-sponsored have passed the House, including H.R. 1973, the Senator Paul Simon Water for the Poor Act of 2005, making safe water and sanitation an objective of U.S. assistance to developing countries.

Wilson is a staunch advocate of a federal prohibition of online poker. In 2006, he co-sponsored H.R. 4411, the Goodlatte-Leach Internet Gambling Prohibition Act, and H.R. 4777, the Internet Gambling Prohibition Act.

Wilson has cited as one of his proudest congressional achievements the Drafting Business Expensing Act of 2003, which allows businesses to immediately write off 50% of the cost of business equipment and machinery. This bonus depreciation provision was extended for 2008 and 2009 in two separate stimulus bills. He also spearheaded the Drafting Teacher Recruitment and Retention Act of 2003, which offers higher education loan forgiveness to math, science and special education teachers in schools with predominantly low-income student populations. He cites as his most important vote the Jobs and Growth Tax Relief Reconciliation Act of 2003.

In 2015, Wilson cosponsored a resolution to amend the Constitution to ban same-sex marriage.

"You lie!" outburst during Obama address

On September 9, 2009, during a nationally televised joint address to Congress by President Barack Obama, Wilson shouted "You lie!" after Obama, while outlining his proposal for reforming health care, said, "There are also those who claim that our reform effort will insure illegal immigrants. This, too, is false—the reforms I'm proposing would not apply to those who are here illegally."

Obama's chief of staff Rahm Emanuel immediately approached senior Republican lawmakers and asked them to identify the heckler and urge him to apologize immediately. Members of Congress from both parties condemned the outburst. "Totally disrespectful", said Senator John McCain of Wilson's utterance. "No place for it in that setting or any other and he should apologize immediately." Wilson said later in a statement:

This evening I let my emotions get the best of me when listening to the President's remarks regarding the coverage of undocumented immigrants in the health care bill. While I disagree with the President's statement, my comments were inappropriate and regrettable. I extend sincere apologies to the President for this lack of civility.

Obama accepted his apology. "I'm a big believer that we all make mistakes", he said. "He apologized quickly and without equivocation and I'm appreciative of that."

House Democrats called on Wilson to issue a formal apology on the House floor. House Majority Whip Jim Clyburn said, "This is about the rules of the House". House Majority Leader Steny Hoyer said, "What's at issue here is of importance to the House and of importance to the country ... This House cannot stay silent".

Wilson refused to apologize to the House of Representatives, saying in a televised interview, "I believe one apology is sufficient." Congressional Republicans agreed, and opposed further action. Minority Leader John Boehner said, "I think this is a sad day for the House of Representatives ... I think this is a political stunt aimed at distracting the American people from what they really care about, which is health care." On September 15, the House approved a "resolution of disapproval" against Wilson by a 240–179 vote almost exactly along party lines.

Wilson said that his outburst reflected his view that Obama's bill would provide government-subsidized benefits to illegal immigrants. Several fact-checking organizations wrote that Wilson's view was inaccurate because HR 3200 expressly excludes undocumented aliens from receiving government-subsidized "affordability credits". The nonpartisan Congressional Research Service agreed that people would need to be lawfully present in the U.S. in order to be eligible for the credits, but noted that the bill did not bar non-citizens from buying their own health insurance coverage through the health insurance exchange. The Obama administration said that, in the final bill, undocumented immigrants would not be able to participate in the Exchange. Such language was included in the Senate Finance Committee's version of the bill, America's Healthy Future Act.

After the incident, Wilson and Democrat Rob Miller, his 2010 general election opponent, experienced a significant upswing in campaign donations. In the week after Wilson's outburst, Miller raised $1.6 million, about three times his 2008 donations, while Wilson raised $1.8 million.

Apology for remarks about hatred of America
On a 2002 live broadcast of the C-SPAN talk show Washington Journal, Wilson and Representative Bob Filner were discussing Iraqi weapons of mass destruction. When Filner noted that the U.S. provided Iraq with "chemical and biological weapons" in the 1980s, Wilson stated that this idea was "made up" and told Filner, "This hatred of America by some people is just outrageous. And you need to get over that." Wilson apologized for his remarks in statements to the press.

Apology for remarks about Strom Thurmond's daughter
In 2003, Essie Mae Washington-Williams revealed she was the daughter of Wilson's former employer, Senator Strom Thurmond, and Thurmond's black maid. Wilson was among those who publicly doubted her assertion that Thurmond had a child out of wedlock. Wilson said even if her story were true, she should not have revealed it because "it's a smear" on Thurmond's image and was a way to "diminish" Thurmond's legacy. After Thurmond's family acknowledged the truth of Washington-Williams's revelation, Wilson apologized, but said that he still thought that she should not have revealed that Thurmond was her father.

Texas v. Pennsylvania
In December 2020, Wilson was one of 126 Republican members of the House of Representatives to sign an amicus brief in support of Texas v. Pennsylvania, a lawsuit filed at the United States Supreme Court contesting the results of the 2020 presidential election, in which Joe Biden defeated incumbent Donald Trump. The Supreme Court declined to hear the case on the basis that Texas lacked standing under Article III of the Constitution to challenge the results of an election held by another state.

House Speaker Nancy Pelosi issued a statement that called signing the amicus brief an act of "election subversion." She also reprimanded Wilson and the other House members who supported the lawsuit: "The 126 Republican Members that signed onto this lawsuit brought dishonor to the House. Instead of upholding their oath to support and defend the Constitution, they chose to subvert the Constitution and undermine public trust in our sacred democratic institutions."

Other notable events

In November 2009, the New York Times reported that Wilson and Representative Blaine Luetkemeyer made identical written statements, reading, "One of the reasons I have long supported the U.S. biotechnology industry is that it is a homegrown success story that has been an engine of job creation in this country. Unfortunately, many of the largest companies that would seek to enter the biosimilar market have made their money by outsourcing their research to foreign countries like India." The statement was originally drafted by lobbyists for Genentech, now a Swiss biotechnology firm, but founded and still headquartered in San Francisco, California.

Wilson supported President Trump's 2017 executive order to impose a temporary ban on entry to the U.S. to citizens of seven Muslim-majority countries, saying that the order would "secure our borders and keep American families safe from terrorist attacks."

On April 10, 2017, a Wilson town hall meeting at Aiken Technical College in Graniteville, South Carolina was interrupted by activists chanting "you lie" as Wilson asserted that the Affordable Care Act was causing people to be denied health services.

In 2018, a segment with Wilson aired as part of Sacha Baron Cohen's Showtime series, Who is America?. Wilson endorses "Kinderguardians", a nonexistent program to teach and arm schoolchildren as young as 3 to protect themselves in the classroom. Advocating toddler carry, he says on camera, "A 3-year-old cannot defend itself from an assault rifle by throwing a Hello Kitty pencil case at it".

In January 2023, Wilson proposed a bill to direct "the Fine Arts Board to obtain a bust of the President of Ukraine, Volodymyr Zelenskyy, for display in the House of Representatives wing of the United States Capitol".

Political campaigns

Wilson was elected in 2001 in a special election caused by the death of Floyd Spence, his former boss. Wilson once said that a dying Spence called him from his hospital bed and asked him to run.

In a crowded five-way Republican primary—the real contest in this heavily Republican district—Wilson tallied 75% of the vote. He won the December 18 special election with 73% of the vote.

Wilson won election to a full term in 2002 with 84% of the vote, facing four minor-party candidates.

Wilson was mentioned as a possible candidate for retiring Senator Fritz Hollings's seat in 2004, but decided to run for a second House term. He defeated Democratic nominee Michael Ellisor and Constitution Party nominee Steve Lefemine with 65% of the vote. Wilson got 181,862 votes to Ellisor's 93,249 and Lefemine's 4,447, with 312 write-ins.

2006
Wilson defeated Ellisor again, with 62.7% of the vote.

2008

Wilson was reelected, defeating the Democratic nominee, Iraq War veteran Rob Miller, 54% to 46%. It was the closest race in the district in 20 years, and the closest race Wilson had faced in 24 years as an elected official. He survived by winning his native Lexington County by 33,000 votes, more than the overall margin of 26,000 votes.

2010

Challenged by Miller, Libertarian nominee Eddie McCain, and Constitution Party nominee Marc Beaman, Wilson was reelected with 53% of the vote.

2012

Redistricting made the 2nd somewhat more compact. It lost Beaufort and Hilton Head Island. To make up for the loss in population, it absorbed all of Aiken County and a slice of Orangeburg County.

In the general election, Wilson ran unopposed and was reelected with 96% of the vote.

2014

Challenged by Democratic nominee Phil Black and Labor Party nominee Harold Geddings III, Wilson was reelected with 62% of the vote.

2016 
Challenged by Democratic nominee Arik Bjorn and American Party nominee Eddie McCain, Wilson was reelected with 62% of the vote.

2018 
Challenged by Democratic nominee Sean Carrigan and Constitution Party candidate Sonny Narang, Wilson was reelected with 56.3% of the vote.

2020 
Challenged by Democratic nominee Adair Ford Boroughs and Constitution Party candidate Kathleen K Wright, Wilson was reelected with 55.66% of the vote.

2022 
see also 2022 United States House of Representatives elections in South Carolina#District 2
Challenged by Democratic nominee Judd Larkins, Wilson was reelected with 60.1% of the vote.

Personal life
An Associate Reformed Presbyterian, Wilson and his wife, Roxanne Dusenbury McCrory Wilson, have four sons and six grandchildren.

In a 2005 guest article on Rediff.com, Wilson wrote that his father, Hugh, was a member of the Flying Tigers in World War II. The Wilson family attends First Presbyterian Church in Columbia.

See also
 List of United States representatives expelled, censured, or reprimanded

References

External links

 Congressman Joe Wilson official U.S. House website
 Joe Wilson for U.S. Congress
 
 
 
 "Congressman with military ties backs Iraq war" Darran Simon, Medill News Service, February 18, 2004
 "Don’t Turn Back the Page on Border Security" Op-ed by Joe Wilson, Palmetto Scoop, February 3, 2008

|-

|-

1947 births
21st-century American politicians
American Presbyterians
Presbyterians from South Carolina
Articles containing video clips
Associate Reformed Presbyterian Church
Censured or reprimanded members of the United States House of Representatives
Lawyers from Charleston, South Carolina
Living people
Military personnel from Charleston, South Carolina
National Guard (United States) colonels
People from West Columbia, South Carolina
Politicians from Charleston, South Carolina
Reagan administration personnel
Republican Party members of the United States House of Representatives from South Carolina
South Carolina lawyers
South Carolina National Guard personnel
Republican Party South Carolina state senators
Tea Party movement activists
United States Army officers
United States Army reservists
University of South Carolina alumni
Washington and Lee University alumni